Marta Mason (born 10 February 1993) is an Italian singer and former footballer who played as a striker. She was an Italy under-19 international. Following her football career, she has pursued a singing career,

Singing career
In the 2016–17 season, Mason took some time away from football to appear on the television singing contest Amici di Maria De Filippi. This marked the beginning of her singing career.

Personal life 
As of 2022, Mason lives in Verona, and divides her time working as a massage therapist, video producer, and singer.

References

1993 births
Living people
Italian women's footballers
Serie A (women's football) players
A.S.D. AGSM Verona F.C. players
A.S.D. Reggiana Calcio Femminile players
Women's association football forwards
A.S.D. Calcio Chiasiellis players
Atalanta Mozzanica Calcio Femminile Dilettantistico players
21st-century Italian singers
21st-century Italian women singers
Italian women singers